Perevi is a village located in the Imereti region of Georgia.

From 2008 to 2010 it was occupied by Russia as part of the Russo-Georgian War.

References
 

Geography of Georgia (country)
Populated places in Sachkhere Municipality